Charles Conrad may refer to:

Pete Conrad (Charles Conrad, Jr., 1930–1999), American astronaut
Charles Magill Conrad (1804–1878), 22nd United States Secretary of War
Charles E. Conrad (1925–2009), acting coach
Charles J. Conrad, member of the California legislature
Charles Conrad Abbott (1843–1919), American archaeologist and naturalist
Charles Conrad Schneider (1843–1916), American civil engineer and bridge designer
Charles F. Conrad (1917–1995), founder of the Lake Michigan Carferry Service